Apache PDFBox is an open source pure-Java library that can be used to create, render, print, split, merge, alter, verify and extract text and meta-data of PDF files.

Open Hub reports over 11,000 commits (since the start as an Apache project) by 18 contributors representing more than 140,000 lines of code. PDFBox has a well established, mature codebase maintained by an average size development team with increasing year-over-year commits. Using the COCOMO model, it took an estimated 46 person-years of effort.

Structure
Apache PDFBox has these components:
 PDFBox: the main part
 FontBox: handles font information
 XmpBox: handles XMP metadata
 Preflight (optional): checks PDF files for PDF/A-1b conformity.

History
PDFBox was started in 2002 in SourceForge by Ben Litchfield who wanted to be able to extract text of PDF files for Lucene. It became an Apache Incubator project in 2008, and an Apache top level project in 2009.

Preflight was originally named PaDaF and developed by Atos worldline, and donated to the project in 2011.

In February 2015, Apache PDFBox was named an Open Source Partner Organization of the PDF Association.

See also 

 List of PDF software

References

External links
Apache PDFBox Project

PDFBox
Free PDF software
Free software programmed in Java (programming language)
Java (programming language) libraries
Java platform
Software using the Apache license